Sanjay Chhel is an Indian film director, writer and lyricist.

Early life
Sanjay Chhel was born on 14 October 1967 at Dwarka in Gujarat, India. He spent his childhood in Mumbai. He is son of art director and production designer Chhel Vayeda.

Career
As his father was a production designer who worked with several play producers, he was inspired to write his first one-act play, Ubhi Chavi Adi Chavi which was very successful. His one-act play Crossword Puzzle gave him recognition. His experimental play Prakaran 1956 was well recognized. He wrote more than 30 TV serials including Rangaberangi, Amasna Tara, Nukkad and Philips Top Ten. He directed and produced a TV series Hum Sab Baraati (2004) for Zee TV.

He has written or directed more than 25 films. He debuted in film industry by writing Pehla Nasha (1993). He debuted in direction with Khoobsurat (1999). He wrote story of Kachche Dhaage (1999), Phir Bhi Dil Hai Hindustani (2000), Maine Pyaar Kyun Kiya? (2005), Partner (2007), Kismat Konnection (2008). He wrote dialogues and lyrics of Dil Toh Baccha Hai Ji (2011). He directed Kyaa Dil Ne Kahaa (2002). He wrote and directed Maan Gaye Mughal-e-Azam (2008) . His film Patel Ki Punjabi Shaadi produced by Bharat Patel released on 15 September 2017 was commercially unsuccessful.

He wrote several popular Hindi film songs including "E Shivani...", "Nikamma Kiya Iss Dilne", "Mahobbat Hai Mirchi..", "Do You Wanna Parter..".

He wrote short stories which were published in Navneet Samarpan, Janmabhoomi, Abhiyan, Parab, Sarvani magazines. He wrote column in Samkalin in 1989–90. He again started writing weekly column, Andaz-e-Bayan in Divya Bhaskar in 2009 which became popular. He writes weekly columns in Gujarati dailies, Mumbai Samachar, Gujarat Mitra, NavGujarat Samay, Kutch Mitra, Phulchhab. His first book Muththi Unchera Kanti Madia, about Gujarati actor-director Kanti Madia, was released in October 2017.  He wrote 10 books of Andaz-e-Bayan series released in 2020 which is a compilation of his columns published in a newspaper. His short story collection Poster was published in 2021.

Personal life
He is a vegetarian. He married his classmate Zankhna and they have a son, Osho. Chhel was called out for sexual harassment in the 2018 MeToo campaign in India by Soma Manghnani.

Filmography

Films

 Rangeela (1995) - dialogues
 Yes Boss (1997) - dialogue
 Daud (1997) - dialogue
 Kachche Dhaage (1999) - story
 Khoobsurat (1999) - Director
 Phir Bhi Dil Hai Hindustani (2000) - story idea, dialogues
 Love You Hamesha (2001) - story
 Kyaa Dil Ne Kahaa (2002) - Director
 Krishna Cottage (2004) - lyrics
 Jo Bole So Nihaal (2005) - story
 Partner (2007) - story
 Maan Gaye Mughal-e-Azam (2008) - Director
 Kismat Konnection (2008) - screenplay
 Good Luck! (2008) - screenplay
 Dil Toh Baccha Hai Ji (2011) - lyrics
 Patel Ki Punjabi Shaadi (2017) - Director
 Kill the Rapist?
 Indu Sarkar (2017) - dialogues
 Love You Loktantra (film) (2022) - dialogues

TV series 
 Naya Nukkad (1993–94)
 Filmy Chakkar (1994–96)
 Mast Mast Hai Zindagi (1995)	
 Main Anari Tu Khiladi (1995)
 Phillips Top 10 (1996–97)
 Dekh Tamasha Dekh (1996–97) 	
 Filmy Chakkar - Season 2 (1997) 	
 Alwaida Darling (2000)
 Humari Bahu Malini Ayyar (2003–04)
 Hum Sab Baraati (2004)	
 Heroine (2010)
 Hitler Didi (2012)
 Taarak Mehta Ka Ooltah Chashmah (2014)
 Suri (Gujarati - 2016)
 Yeh Un Dino Ki Baat Hai (2017–18)
 Saat Phero Ki Hera Pherie (2018)

See also
 List of Gujarati-language writers

References

External links
 

Hindi-language film directors
20th-century Indian film directors
Film directors from Mumbai
Living people
People from Devbhoomi Dwarka district
1967 births
Gujarati-language writers
Indian lyricists
21st-century Indian film directors
Hindi screenwriters
Indian male screenwriters
Film directors from Gujarat
Screenwriters from Gujarat